Lane Tietgen (born Topeka, Kansas) was an American poet, composer and musician who sang and played guitar and bass. Tietgen lived in the Bay Area in California. He died on 14 July 2020, as reported in the Sonoma News

A number of Tietgen's songs have been covered by famous musicians, including "Captain Bobby Stout" and "Martha's Madman" by Manfred Mann's Earth Band, "It Can't Make Any Difference to Me" by Dave Mason, and "Red and Black Blues" by Ringo Starr. In 2006 Ice Cube used a melody by Tietgen for his song, "Click, Clack – Get Back!," on the album Laugh Now, Cry Later.

Tietgen began his musical career as the guitarist and primary songwriter for The Serfs, who achieved some fame in and around the band's home state of Kansas. In 1970, the blues-jazz-rock band, The Jerry Hahn Brotherhood, recorded seven Tietgen compositions, including "Captain Bobby Stout" and "Martha's Madmen". The Jerry Hahn Brotherhood featured Hahn, Mike Finnigan, Clyde Graves and George Marsh.

In 2009 The Serfs were inducted into the Kansas Music Hall of Fame. That same year, Tietgen released a solo album, Wheels of Fortune, featuring all original songs.

Tietgen regularly performed live as a folk singer and guitarist in music venues.

Discography 
Selection

The Jerry Hahn Brotherhood 

Seven of the ten songs were written by Lane Tietgen:
 "Martha's Madman"
 "Early Bird Cafe"
 "One Man Woman"
 "Time's Caught Up With You"
 "Thursday Thing"
 "What I Gave Away"
 "Captain Bobby Stout"

Lane Tietgen: Wheels of Fortune 

Folk-rock record of Lane Tietgen, published in 2009

Artists 
Lane Tietgen: Accordion, Bass, Composer, Executive Producer, Guitar (Acoustic), Harmonica, Horn Arrangements, Mandolin, Organ, Slide Guitar, Trombone, Vocals, Wah Wah Guitar 
Adam "Bagel" Berkowitz: Associate Producer, Drums, Engineer, Mixing, Percussion 
Stephen Hart: Mastering
Terry Ann Gillette: violin
Songs:
 "Wheel of Fortune"
 "Deep Waters of the Heart"		
 "Sweet Alchemy"		
 "Some Call It Evil"		
 "My Heart's One Desire"		
 "Love and Redemption"		
 "Raindrops On the Page"		
 "Eight-Ball Blues"		
 "Mama Bring That Good Thing Over Here"		
 "MLK Riot 1968"

Links 
Lane Tietgens Discography on discogs.com
Kenny Bloomquist and Lane Tietgen accept the Kansas Music Hall of Fame award., YouTube-Video

References 

20th-century births
2020 deaths
American male poets
Year of birth missing
People from Topeka, Kansas